Liceo Marconi can refer to:

Schools in Italy:
 Liceo Marconi Conegliano - Conegliano
 Liceo Scientifico e Liceo Artistico "G.Marconi" - Foligno
 Liceo Scientifico "G. Marconi" - Milan
 Liceo scientifico e musicale Marconi - Pesaro
 Liceo Marconi Pescara - Pescara
 Liceo Scientifico Statale "G. Marconi" - Sassari

Schools outside of Italy:
 Liceo Superimentale "G. Marconi" in Asmara, Eritrea
 The high school section of La Scuola d'Italia Guglielmo Marconi in New York City